Alexandrovsky District is the name of several administrative and municipal districts in Russia. The district names are generally derived from or related to the male first name Alexander.

Modern districts

Alexandrovsky District, Orenburg Oblast, an administrative and municipal district of Orenburg Oblast
Alexandrovsky District, a municipal district of Perm Krai, which Alexandrovsk, the town of krai significance, is incorporated as
Alexandrovsky District, Stavropol Krai, an administrative and municipal district of Stavropol Krai
Alexandrovsky District, Tomsk Oblast, an administrative and municipal district of Tomsk Oblast
Alexandrovsky District, Vladimir Oblast, an administrative and municipal district of Vladimir Oblast

Renamed districts
Alexandrovsky District, in 1927–1931, name of Polyarny District (1927–1960) of Murmansk Okrug of Leningrad Oblast, Russian SFSR, Soviet Union

See also
Alexandrovsky Uyezd, an administrative division of Arkhangelsk Governorate of the Russian Empire and later of the Russian SFSR

References